The 1879 Stevens Ducks football team was an American football team that represented Stevens Institute of Technology in the 1879 college football season. The team compiled a 1–2–5 record and was outscored by a total of 12 to 6. The team played its home games at the St. George's Cricket Club grounds in Hoboken, New Jersey.

Schedule

References

Stevens
Stevens Tech Ducks football seasons
Stevens football